Zab Maboungou is a Franco-Congolese dancer, writer and choreographer.

Biography 
Born in France and raised in Congo-Brazzaville, Maboungou is based in Montreal where she founded the Compagnie Danse Nyata Nyata in 1988. She has since choreographed and performed numerous solo and group works, among which Mozongi which received the Prix de la danse de Montréal in 2015.

Maboungou's steadfast advocacy and support of dance and the performing arts of Africa and the diaspora has garnered her numerous prizes and accolades, including being honoured during Kriye Bode’s 5th Annual Colloquium on Haitian Dance & Drum at Alvin Ailey American Dance Theater.

Since 2004 Nyata Nyata has also been a teaching institution, dispensing the two-year Programme d’entraînement et de formation artistique et professionnel en danse (PEFAPDA - artistic and professional training program in dance).

Since 2015 Zab Maboungou/Compagnie danse Nyata Nyata has been a member of the International Dance Council.

In May 2019, Maboungou was named to L'Ordre des arts et des lettres du Québec.

Dance works 
 1993 : Réverdanse
 1997 : Mozongi
 1999 : Incantation
 2005 : Lwáza
 2006 : Nsamu
 2007 : Décompte
 2009 : Gestes Dé/libérés
 2010 : Montréal by Night
 2018 : Wamunzo

Writing 
 Heya... danse ! Historique, poétique et didactique de la danse africaine, CIDIHCA, Montréal, Canada, 2005

Prizes 
 1999 : "Grand hommage", Ministry of culture of Cameroon 
 2003 : "Pioneer of African Dance in Canada",  Dance Immersion, Toronto 
 2015 : Prix de la danse de Montréal, Prix du CAM pour la diversité culturelle en danse
 2019 : L’Ordre des arts et des lettres du Québec

References

External links 
 Compagnie danse Nyata Nyata
 Documentary film Wamunzo en Création
 Documentary film Wamunzo en Paroles

French women choreographers
French female dancers
Black Canadian dancers
20th-century French women writers
21st-century French women writers
Republic of the Congo women
Living people
Year of birth missing (living people)
Canadian people of Republic of the Congo descent